Marina City is a mixed-use residential-commercial building complex in Chicago, Illinois, United States, North America, designed by architect Bertrand Goldberg. The multi-building complex opened between 1963 and 1967 and occupies almost an entire city block on State Street on the north bank of the Chicago River on the Near North Side, directly across from the Loop. Portions of the complex were designated a Chicago Landmark in 2016.

The complex consists of two , 65-story apartment towers, opened in 1963, which include physical plant penthouses. It also includes a 10-story office building (now a hotel) opened in 1964, and a saddle-shaped auditorium building originally used as a cinema. The four buildings, access driveways, and a small plaza that originally included an ice rink are built on a raised platform next to the Chicago River. Beneath the platform, at river level, is a small marina for pleasure craft, giving the structures their name.

History 
The Marina City complex was designed in 1959 by architect Bertrand Goldberg and constructed between 1961 and 1968 at a cost of $36 million, financed to a large extent by Building Service Employees International Union, a union of building janitors and elevator operators, who sought to reverse the pattern of white flight from the city's downtown area. When finished, the two towers were both the tallest residential buildings and the tallest reinforced concrete structures in the world. The complex was built as a "city within a city", featuring numerous on-site facilities including a theater, gym, swimming pool, ice rink, bowling alley, stores, restaurants, and, of course, a marina.

Marina City was built in a joint venture with Brighton Construction Company (owner: Thomas J. Bowler) and James McHugh Construction Company. James McHugh Construction Co. subsequently built Water Tower Place in 1976 and Trump Tower in 2009, both of which were also the tallest reinforced concrete structures in the world at the times they were built. Marina City was the first building in the United States to be constructed with the Linden climbing tower cranes.

WLS-TV (ABC Channel 7) transmitted from an antenna atop Marina City until the Willis Tower (formerly known as Sears Tower) was completed. Local radio station WCFL operated out of Marina City in the office building of the complex. Local television station WFLD (FOX Channel 32) had its studios and transmitter at Marina City for 18 years until they were bought by Metromedia.

Marina City was the first post-war urban high-rise residential complex in the United States and is widely credited with beginning the residential renaissance of American inner cities. Its model of mixed residential and office uses and high-rise towers with a base of parking has become a primary model for urban development in the United States and throughout the world, and has been widely copied throughout many cities internationally.

Architecture 

The two towers contain identical floor plans. The bottom 19 floors form an exposed spiral parking ramp operated by valet with approximately 896 parking spaces. The 20th floor of each contains a laundry room and gym with panoramic views of the Loop, while floors 21 through 60 contain apartments (450 per tower). A 360-degree open-air roof deck lies on the 61st and top story. The buildings are accessed from separate lobbies that share a common below-grade mezzanine level as well as ground-level plaza entrances beside the House of Blues. Originally rental apartments, the complex converted to condominiums in 1977, but still contains a number of rental units.

Marina City apartments are unusual in containing almost no interior right angles. Apartments are composed of these units. Bathrooms and kitchens are located towards the inside of the building. Living areas occupy the outermost areas of each unit. Each unit terminates in a  semi-circular balcony, separated from living areas by a floor-to-ceiling window wall. Because of this arrangement, every single living room and bedroom in Marina City has a balcony.

The apartments are also unusual in that they function solely on electricity; neither natural gas nor propane serves any function. The apartments are not provided with hot water, air conditioning, or heat from a central source, as was the common practice at the time the towers were built. Instead, each unit contains individual water heaters, heating and cooling units, and electric stoves; residents pay individually for the electricity needed to run these appliances. This might have been a financial decision on the part of the building owners; at the time these towers were constructed, local electric utility Commonwealth Edison provided expensive building transformers at little or no charge, provided the buildings were made all-electric.

In addition, the residential towers are noted for the high speed of their elevators. It takes approximately 33 seconds to travel from the lower-level lobby to the 61st floor roof decks.

The towers were awarded a prize by the New York Chapter of the American Institute of Architects in 1965 for their innovation.

The appearance of the towers is said to have inspired a similar design for the Corinthian Tower in New York.

In 2007, the condominium board controversially claimed to own the common law copyright and trademark rights to the name and image of the buildings, although they do not own the parking garage portion of the buildings located below the 20th floor. They have claimed that any commercial use (such as in film or other media, such as on web sites) of pictures of the buildings or of the name "Marina City" without permission is a violation of their intellectual property rights.

In celebration of the 2018 Illinois Bicentennial, Marina City was selected as one of the Illinois 200 Great Places by the American Institute of Architects Illinois component (AIA Illinois).

Current use 
The complex houses the House of Blues concert hall, restaurant and bar, the Hotel Chicago, 10Pin Bowling Lounge, and four restaurants (Yolk, Smith and Wollensky, Katana, and Dick's Last Resort).

The House of Blues concert hall was built in the shell of the complex's long-disused movie theater. Similarly, the hotel was built in what was once the Marina City office building. In order to accommodate Smith and Wollensky, the former skating rink was demolished. Pedestrian and vehicular access to the residential towers and the raised common plaza were redesigned. In 2006, decorative lighting was installed around the circular roofs of the mechanical sheds that top each tower; the towers had not contained any such lighting since the 1960s.

In popular culture 

 The towers are on the front cover of the 2002 album Yankee Hotel Foxtrot by Chicago band Wilco, which has led to Marina City occasionally being called the "Wilco Towers".
 The towers are in a collage on the rear cover of the 1971 Sly and the Family Stone album There's a Riot Goin' On.
 The towers are the basis for the cover art of the band Chicago's 1979 album, "Chicago 13."
 One tower is on the cover of The Revolting Cocks' debut album Big Sexy Land, released in 1986 by Chicago label Wax Trax! Records.
 The label design used by Mercury Records in the 1970s and early 1980s featured a painting of the towers along with IBM Plaza and John Hancock Center.

The towers' appearances include: 
 Goldstein (1964). Includes a sequence driving up the 14th floor parking levels.
 The Bob Newhart Show (1972–1978). The opening sequence included a shot of Marina City, leading many to assume that the character lived there. Marina City is situated near the building that was used for exterior shots of Bob's office, 430 North Michigan Avenue. The building used for exterior shots of Bob's apartment sits  to the north, on Sheridan Road in the Edgewater neighborhood.
 Three The Hard Way (1974), Jagger Daniels (Fred Williamson) is a resident in one of the towers.
 The Hunter (1980), "Papa" Thorson (Steve McQueen) pursues a suspect in a car chase through the parking garage. His quarry eventually loses control and drives off a high floor of the garage into the Chicago River. This scene was later recreated for an Allstate commercial in 2006/2007.
 Nothing In Common (1986), the parking ramp was used as a location in the Tom Hanks film.
 While You Were Sleeping (film) (1995), the towers are visible in the background when Lucy and her boss eat a hotdog on a bridge across the Chicago river.
 Chicago P.D. (2014–present), the second spin-off in the Chicago franchise trilogy. Marina City was used to film a scene in the season 3 episode "Debts of the Past", in which the Chicago Police Department detectives are staking out for and attempt to arrest a suspect.
 Emergency Call Ambulance (Sega 1999), Arcade racing videogame - the player drives between the towers in the third case, and the towers are visible from a longer distance in the final case as well.
The Good Wife  (2009-2016), in the episode “The Wheels of Justice”, Marina City is shown as the residence of attorney Diane Lockhart (Christine Baranski).
Gunsmith Cats (ガンスミス キャッツ, Gansumisu Kyattsu) (Japanese manga, 1991-1997), Marina city's distinctive parking is featured in a car chase early in the series, which features remarkably accurate portrayals of Chicago's architecture and its surroundings.
 Candyman (2021), the character Finley Stephens, an art critic, lives in Marina City. The main character, Anthony McCoy (played by Yahya Abdul-Mateen II), also has one of his Candyman-based visions in her apartment.

See also 
Architecture of Chicago
Dorint Hotel Tower, Augsburg, Germany
The Sentinels, Birmingham, England
The Corinthian (Manhattan), New York
List of tallest buildings in Chicago

References

Bibliography

External links 

City Within A City: The Biography of Chicago’s Marina City
Great Buildings - Marina City
City of Chicago Landmarks Report
Society of Architectural Historians SAH ARCHIPEDIA entry on Marina City
Galinsky - Marina City
Lecture by Goldberg with blueprints and construction photos
Marina City review by a+t magazine
The band "Marina City"
Marina City
Chicago Names Marina City an Official Landmark

Residential buildings completed in 1964
Residential condominiums in Chicago
Residential skyscrapers in Chicago
Bertrand Goldberg buildings
Twin towers
Round buildings
Chicago Landmarks
1964 establishments in Illinois